The men's 400 metres hurdles at the 2008 Summer Olympics took place on 16–18 August at the Beijing National Stadium. There were 26 competitors from 19 nations. The event was won by Angelo Taylor of the United States, the nation's 18th victory in the men's 400 metres hurdles. Taylor was the seventh man to win multiple medals in the event, and third to win two golds. The United States completed its fifth podium sweep in the men's long hurdles, as Kerron Clement and Bershawn Jackson took silver and bronze.

Background
This was the 24th time the event was held. It had been introduced along with the men's 200 metres hurdles in 1900, with the 200 being dropped after 1904 and the 400 being held through 1908 before being left off the 1912 programme. However, when the Olympics returned in 1920 after World War I, the men's 400 metres hurdles was back and would continue to be contested at every Games thereafter.

Five of the eight finalists from the 2004 Games returned: gold medalist Félix Sánchez of the Dominican Republic, silver medalist Danny McFarlane of Jamaica, fifth-place finisher Bayano Kamani of Panama, sixth-place finisher Marek Plawgo of Poland, and seventh-place finisher Alwyn Myburgh of South Africa. Also returning was 2000 gold medalist American Angelo Taylor, who had been defeated in the semifinals in Athens 2004. Taylor was joined by the last two World Champions on the American team; Bershawn Jackson had won in 2005 and Kerron Clement in 2007.

The People's Republic of China and Kyrgyzstan each made their debut in the event. The United States made its 23rd appearance, most of any nation, having missed only the boycotted 1980 Games.

Summary
The defending champion was "The Dictator" Félix Sánchez, but his reign ended short when he received the news of his grandmother, Lilian's death, just before his heat. He ran an uninspired race and was eliminated, though he returned four years later to again win the gold medal. The current world champion, defeating Sanchez, Kerron Clement looked like the likely favorite. Also in the field was 2000 Olympic champion Angelo Taylor. Taylor and Bershawn Jackson ran the fastest times in the semi-finals and got the outer center lanes Taylor in 6, Jackson in 7. The other semi was won by Clement in 4 and masters aged Danny McFarlane in 5. Nobody was in lane one in lane races at these Olympics.

Taylor and Clement were out fast, with Taylor making up the stagger on the typically slow starting Jackson by the third hurdle. McFarlane was the only one to stay with the American duo who were almost clearing hurdles in unison to the middle of the second turn. Starting at the seventh hurdle, Taylor started to have a slight edge, with both Taylor and Clement coming off the turn together, free of McFarlane and the rest of the field. McFarlane took the ninth hurdle awkwardly at the same time as "Batman" Jackson began his patented sprint to the finish. Clement also hit the ninth hurdle and struggled, taking two extra steps to carefully clear the tenth hurdle. Meanwhile, Taylor kept his stride, powerfully clearing the final hurdle and sprinting to victory. With Clement slowing and Jackson sprinting, the gap between the two narrowed quickly but Clement was able to hold on for silver. McFarlane took the final hurdle smoothly and also mounted a charge, but was not able to catch Jackson's furious dive at Clement leaving the results as an American sweep. Three days later, America would duplicate the sweep in the 400 metres.

In repeating as Olympic champion non-consecutively, Taylor joined a rare club including Paavo Nurmi, Volodymyr Holubnychy, Heike Drechsler, Nina Romashkova and Edwin Moses (caused by the boycott). Ulrike Meyfarth did it remarkably 12 years apart. Sánchez, along with Meseret Defar and Ezekiel Kemboi would complete the same feat four years later.

Qualification

Each National Olympic Committee (NOC) was able to enter up to three entrants providing they had met the A qualifying standard (49.20) in the qualifying period (1 January 2007 to 23 July 2008). The maximum number of athletes per nation had been set at 3 since the 1930 Olympic Congress. NOCs were also permitted to enter one athlete providing he had met the B standard (49.50) in the same qualifying period.

Competition format
The competition used the three-round format used every Games since 1908 (except the four-round competition in 1952): quarterfinals, semifinals, and a final. The number of semifinals was reduced from 3 to 2 as the size of the field was smaller than 2000 and 2004. Ten sets of hurdles were set on the course. The hurdles were 3 feet (91.5 centimetres) tall and were placed 35 metres apart beginning 45 metres from the starting line, resulting in a 40 metres home stretch after the last hurdle. The 400 metres track was standard.

There were 4 quarterfinal heats with between 6 and 7 athletes each. The top 3 men in each quarterfinal advanced to the semifinals along with the next fastest 4 overall. The 16 semifinalists were divided into 2 semifinals of 8 athletes each, with the top 4 in each semifinal advancing to the 8-man final.

Records

Prior to this competition, the existing world and Olympic records were as follows:

No new world or Olympic records were set for this event.

Schedule

All times are China Standard Time (UTC+8)

Results

Quarterfinals

Quarterfinal 1

Quarterfinal 2

Quarterfinal 3

Quarterfinal 4

Semifinals

Semifinal 1

Semifinal 2

Final

Results summary

References

Athletics at the 2008 Summer Olympics
400 metres hurdles at the Olympics
Men's events at the 2008 Summer Olympics